Zent is an unincorporated community in Monroe County, Arkansas, United States.

References

Unincorporated communities in Monroe County, Arkansas
Unincorporated communities in Arkansas